Harpalus pseudophonoides is a species of ground beetle in the subfamily Harpalinae. It was described by Schauberger in 1930.

References

pseudophonoides
Beetles described in 1930